Scalptia scalariformis is a species of sea snail, a marine gastropod mollusk in the family Cancellariidae, the nutmeg snails.

Description

S. scalariformis can be distinguished from S. harmulensis, a closely related species, by possessing a multispiral protoconch and fewer axial ribs.

Distribution
This species occurs in the Red Sea, and in the Indian Ocean off Tanzania and Madagascar.

References

 Hemmen J. (2007) Recent Cancellariidae. Annotated and illustrated catalogue of Recent Cancellariidae. Privately published, Wiesbaden. 428 pp. (With amendments and corrections taken from Petit R.E. (2012) A critique of, and errata for, Recent Cancellariidae by Jens Hemmen, 2007. Conchologia Ingrata 9: 1–8.) 

Cancellariidae
Gastropods described in 1822